Long Shadows is a 2022 American crime thriller written by David Baldacci and published by the Grand Central Publishing. It is the author's 51st crime book and 7th in the Memory Man/Amos Decker series which features an eponymous detective as the central character. The novel was ranked as the New York Times Best Seller in October 2022.

Reviews 
The book has received positive reviews from Kirkus Reviews and other independent book reviewers.

References 

2022 American novels
American crime novels
American thriller novels
Grand Central Publishing books
Novels by David Baldacci